Elevator is Hot Hot Heat's second studio album, released on April 4, 2005 (see 2005 in music) internationally and a day later in the United States. It ranked #57 in Amazon.com's Top 100 Editor's Picks of 2005.

It is the band's last album to feature original guitarist Dante DeCaro, who left after the recording of this album.

Track listing

Both the back cover of the album and the liner notes list the songs in reverse order. Thus, the track numbers appear as they would in an elevator, with 1 at the bottom, 15 at the top, and a missing thirteenth track, like a missing thirteenth floor button in an elevator.''
The album's cover does not list track 13, listing 12 then 14. There is a track 13 on the album, sometimes titled "Four Seconds of Noise", which is merely the final four seconds of the ending guitar riff from "Soldier in a Box".

Track 5 "You Owe Me an IOU" is featured in the soundtrack of MVP Baseball 2005. Track 8 "Pickin' It Up" was used in the soundtrack of Madden NFL 06 and SSX on Tour.

Personnel
Hot Hot Heat
 Steve Bays – vocals, piano, organ
 Paul Hawley – drums, percussion, guitar (tracks 5, 6, & 10), acoustic guitar (tracks 11 & 15)
 Dante DeCaro – guitars
 Dustin Hawthorne – "the Bass Guitar"

Additional personnel
 D. Sardy – producer, mixing, additional percussion and guitar
 Greg Gordon – engineer
 Ryan Castle – editing
 Warren Huart – editing
 Stephen Marcussen – mastering
 Craig Aaronson – A&R
 Rebel Waltz, Inc. - management
 Stephen Walker – artwork, art direction, design
 Phil Knott – artwork, design, photography
 John Hobbs – artwork, design

Charts

Album

Singles

References

Miscellanea

Hot Hot Heat albums
2005 albums
Warner Records albums
Albums produced by Dave Sardy